Thelma is a 2017 Norwegian supernatural thriller drama film directed by Joachim Trier. The screenplay was written by Trier and Eskil Vogt. The film stars Eili Harboe, Kaya Wilkins, Henrik Rafaelsen, and Ellen Dorrit Petersen. Thelma tells the story of a sheltered young woman who discovers she has an inexplicable power that materializes when she feels desire for a female student at her university.

Thelma was selected as the Norwegian entry for the Oscar as Best Foreign Language Film at the 90th Academy Awards, but did not receive the nomination.

Plot

Thelma is a lonely and repressed young woman from an ultra-religious Christian family who has lived a sheltered life under the protection of her father, Trond, and disabled mother, Unni. She struggles to make friends and soon after moving to Oslo to attend university begins to experience unexplained epileptic seizures. When she meets another student, Anja, she discovers that her feelings for Anja trigger uncontrollable psychokinetic powers. Thelma suffers much guilt over her feelings for Anja, and wishes she was not in love with her.

While undergoing a brain tomography test to find the cause of her seizures, she begins to think about Anja and as she focuses on her, Thelma's power is set in motion and she unconsciously and unwittingly makes Anja vanish into empty space. Distraught and confused by Anja's sudden disappearance, Thelma returns home and soon remembers that when she was a little girl she had a baby brother. Once, when feeling neglected and jealous of the attention given to her younger sibling, and wishing him to be quiet and gone, she involuntarily caused him to teleport from his crib and reappear underneath the sofa. In a final tragic incident, she caused him to disappear from his bath, and he was found trapped below the ice of a frozen lake by her father. Traumatized, Thelma's mother tried to take her own life by jumping off a bridge, but instead the failed attempt left her paraplegic. Thelma had forgotten these events. Realising her utter distress, her parents tell her the truth, which is that she is somehow able to manifest whatever she deeply wants and that she inherited the same inexplicable ability from her grandmother (who blamed herself for the disappearance of Thelma's grandfather and was kept sedated in a psychiatric nursing home by Trond). Thelma perceives that her parents have a similar fate in mind for her as her grandmother. Though Trond expresses some misgivings about drugging Thelma, Unni tells him it's their responsibility to stop Thelma.

Earlier, while visiting Anja, Thelma recalled how her father once held her hand over a lit candle until it almost burned so that she could feel what Hell's eternal fire was like. She causes the death of her father by telekinetically making him self-combust whilst out boating on the unfrozen lake. Thelma realizes that her power can also restore life when she revives a small dead bird. She begins to understand that her supernatural ability is also a gift and uses it to heal her mother, making her able to walk again. Along with the realization that she can summon her power, Thelma is able to finally control it, and brings Anja back to existence. She returns to college, now with Anja as her girlfriend.

Cast
 Eili Harboe as Thelma
 Grethe Eltervåg as young Thelma
 Kaya Wilkins as Anja
 Henrik Rafaelsen as Trond
 Ellen Dorrit Petersen as Unni

Production
Thelma was produced by Thomas Robsahm of Norwegian production company Motlys, and co-produced by Film Väst, Filmpool Nord and B-Reel (Sweden), Snowglobe Film (Denmark), and Le Pacte (France); with financial support provided by the Norwegian Film Institute, Swedish Film Institute, Danish Film Institute, Copenhagen Film Fund, Nordic Film & TV Fund, Eurimages, and MEDIA Programme. The final production budget was €5,009,000 (i.e. 47 million NOK, 5.8 million USD). 

Principal photography began on 20 September 2016 and lasted 44 days. Locations included Oslo in Norway, and Västra Götaland, Gothenburg, Trollhättan and Kiruna in Sweden.

The film poster was released in August 2017. The key art for the U.S. was released in September in advance of the American premiere, followed by the UK in October.

Release
The film premiered at the Norwegian International Film Festival on 20 August 2017. Thelma held its international premiere at the Toronto International Film Festival as a Special Presentation on 9 September. It premiered in the United States at Fantastic Fest on 21 September, and screened at the New York Film Festival as a Main Slate selection on 6 October. It premiered in the United Kingdom at the BFI London Film Festival as a Cult Gala presentation on 14 October.

Thelma was released theatrically in Norway on 15 September. It was released in the United Kingdom on 3 November, followed by the United States on 10 November.

The Orchard acquired the North American distribution rights to the film in April the same year. Distribution rights to the United Kingdom were acquired by Thunderbird Releasing in August.

Critical reception
The website's critical consensus reads: "Thelma plays with genre tropes in unexpected ways, delivering a thoughtfully twisty supernatural thriller with a lingering impact". On Metacritic, the film received a score of 74 out of 100, based on 31 leading critics, indicating "generally favorable reviews". In IndieWire'''s annual critics poll of best films and performances, it was selected a "Critics Pick" for Best Foreign Language Film. The Hollywood Reporter selected Thelma as one of the best LGBT films of 2017.

Manohla Dargis wrote in The New York Times that Thelma is "a romance, a psychological thriller, a liberation story and a whodunit (and why) ... and most satisfyingly, it plays with the female Gothic ... in which women are at once the victims and agents of change", praising Joachim Trier with having "a great talent for making loneliness visceral and visible, for showing how pain can make the world disappear". In the Los Angeles Times, Justin Chang said the film was a "muted and moody supernatural chiller" that is "thoughtful and beautifully composed" with sequences "that tap into a vividly primal sense of terror".

Peter Bradshaw of The Guardian described Thelma as "an uncanny accumulation of mood, an ecstasy of disquiet" and the performance by Eili Harboe as "outstandingly good". AfterEllen praised the performance by Harboe as "exhilarating, and incredibly moving", and said that "in a sea of lesbian films that are often repetitive, Thelma explores analytical territory that none other has before". David Friend of The Canadian Press said the film carries "an ominous and sinister tone that evokes the best traits of classics like 'Carrie' and 'Let the Right One In'".

Bilge Ebiri of The Village Voice described the film's story as moving "away from the monstrous, toward compassion and understanding ... prob[ing] the profound underlying sadness beneath tales of possession" and "makes vivid the protagonist's loneliness and despair". David Ehrlich wrote in IndieWire that Thelma was "an ominous, unnerving, and strangely powerful thriller about the most devious of human desires" and "consistently keyed in to the persuasive power of the female body".

In The Hollywood Reporter, David Rooney said it contained "intelligent, measured tone and elegant visual style" and "while the more enigmatic supernatural elements at times veer close to formulaic Hollywood horror tropes, the movie maintains a compelling seriousness, particularly in its consideration of the conflict between sexuality and repression". Andrew Barker of Variety described the film as "an unnervingly effective slow-burn, and those with the patience for Trier’s patient accumulation of detail will find it pays off in unexpected ways".The Verge said Thelma was a "quietly beautiful film" and "a thriller that's scary, sad, and ultimately triumphant", with cinematography that is "visually ... striking throughout". Margaret Barton-Fumo from Film Comment summarized Thelma'' as "a romantic film that pays close attention to physical detail", and "surprisingly tender, [it] proves itself a modern take on the supernatural film".

Accolades

Home media
The DVD for Region 2 and Blu-ray for Region B was released by SF Studios in Scandinavia on 4 December 2017. They were released in the UK by Thunderbird Releasing on 26 February 2018. In Region 1 the DVD was released by The Orchard through Passion River Films on 3 April 2018.

See also
 List of LGBT-related films
 Lists of Norwegian films
 List of Norwegian submissions for the Academy Award for Best Foreign Language Film
 List of submissions to the 90th Academy Awards for Best Foreign Language Film

Notes

References

Further reading

External links
 
  Thelma at Thunderbird Releasing 
  Thelma at The Orchard 
  Thelma at Norwegian Film Institute 
  Thelma at Danish Film Institute 
  Thelma at BFI
 
  Thelma at Lumiere
 

2017 films
2017 drama films
2017 LGBT-related films
2017 thriller drama films
2010s Norwegian-language films
2010s supernatural thriller films
2010s thriller films
Lesbian-related films
LGBT-related horror films
Norwegian drama films
Norwegian LGBT-related films
Norwegian speculative fiction films
Films about sexual repression
Films set in Oslo
Films set in Norway
Films shot in Gothenburg
Films shot in Norway
Films shot in Oslo
Films shot in Sweden
Films shot in Trollhättan
Films directed by Joachim Trier
Films with screenplays by Eskil Vogt
The Orchard (company) films